József Csák (born 10 November 1966, in Budapest) is a Hungarian judoka. He competed at four Olympic Games.

Achievements

References

External links
 

1966 births
Living people
Hungarian male judoka
Judoka at the 1988 Summer Olympics
Judoka at the 1992 Summer Olympics
Judoka at the 1996 Summer Olympics
Judoka at the 2000 Summer Olympics
Olympic judoka of Hungary
Olympic silver medalists for Hungary
Olympic medalists in judo
Medalists at the 1992 Summer Olympics
Goodwill Games medalists in judo
Martial artists from Budapest
Competitors at the 1994 Goodwill Games
20th-century Hungarian people
21st-century Hungarian people